Fremont Christian School (FCS), is a private Christian school located in Fremont, California, U.S. It was founded in 1968.

References

External links 
 

Christian schools in California
Educational institutions established in 1968
Schools in Fremont, California
High schools in Alameda County, California
Private K-12 schools in California
Bay Counties League
1968 establishments in California